The Potsdam Royals are an American football team from Potsdam, Germany.

The club's greatest achievement is winning the championship in the last Eurobowl (2019) against the Amsterdam Crusaders just a year after they entered the German Football League, the top tier American Football league in Germany.

History 
The Royals were formed in 2005 and entered league competition one year later in the fifth tier. Getting promoted after the seasons 2008 and 2009, the Royals finished season 2010 by winning the championship in the third tier league Regionalliga Ost. Winning the subsequent qualification they earned a spot in the German Football League 2. The club rejected the spot and withdrew the football team.

In 2012 the Royals re-entered the competition and had to start again in the fifth tier. With two succeeding perfect seasons the Royals were 2014 back in the Regionalliga Ost. They finished the season with the championship and were promoted to the GFL2. In 2017 the Royals became champions of the GFL2 North with a perfect seasons and won the play-offs to qualify for the German Football League, the highest level in Germany.

German Bowl appearances
The club's appearances in the German Bowl:

Recent seasons
Recent seasons of the Royals:

 PR = Promotion round
 QF = Quarter finals
 SF = Semi finals
 GB = German Bowl

References

External links 
  Official website
  German Football League official website
  Football History Historic American football tables from Germany

American football teams in Germany
German Football League teams
American football teams established in 2005
Sport in Potsdam
2005 establishments in Germany